Binley may refer to:

Places 
Binley, Coventry, a district of Coventry, West Midlands, England
Binley Woods, a village in the Rugby borough of Warwickshire, England, formerly called "Binley"
Binley, Hampshire, a place in Hampshire, England

People 
Brian Binley (1942-2020), British politician, Conservative Party Member of Parliament for Northampton South 2005-2015
Margaret Binley, 18th-century English silversmith